Nigel Lucius Graeme Finch (1 August 1949 – 14 February 1995) was an English film director and filmmaker whose career influenced the growth of British gay cinema.

Biography
Nigel Finch was born in Tenterden, Kent, the son of Graham and Tibby Finch, and raised in Bromley, south east London. He studied art history at the University of Sussex.

Finch began working as co-editor for the BBC television documentary series Arena in the early 1970s. He produced and directed many notable programs including My Way (1978), and The Private Life of the Ford Cortina (1982). He rose to prominence with the documentary Chelsea Hotel (1981), which profiled the famed New York hotel and its legacy of famous gay guests, including Oscar Wilde, Tennessee Williams, William S. Burroughs, Quentin Crisp and Andy Warhol. His documentary subjects include artist Robert Mapplethorpe (1988), filmmaker Kenneth Anger (1991), and artist Louise Bourgeois (1994). Finch went on to direct films such as the BAFTA-nominated drama The Lost Language of Cranes, and the musical soap opera The Vampyr.

Finch died from AIDS-related illness in London in 1995 during post-production of his first full-length feature film Stonewall, a docudrama loosely based on events leading up to the 1969 Stonewall riots in New York City.

Filmography

Accolades

Nigel Finch's death was commemorated in the ending title of the opera-film "Dido and Aeneas" (1995) directed by Peter Maniura (conducted by Richard Hickox. See the corresponding entry in Dido and Aeneas discography).

References

External links
 
 Nigel Finch at the British Film Institute
 The Independent: Nigel Finch obituary

1949 births
1995 deaths
English film directors
English television directors
LGBT film directors
People from Tenterden
AIDS-related deaths in England
People from Bromley
Alumni of the University of Sussex
20th-century English LGBT people